The MRT Line 1 is Dhaka's rapid transit line under construction. It will be the second of the Dhaka Metro Rail system and will be operated by Dhaka Mass Transit Company Limited (DMTCL). Its construction started in February 2023. It is scheduled to open in December 2026.

History
In 2005, the World Bank published a study report, recommending that the government of Bangladesh build a mass transit system in Dhaka. In the same year, American consultancy firm Louis Berger Group prepared a strategic transport plan for Dhaka. The World Bank helped to develop this plan, which proposed the construction of three MRT lines in Dhaka. The three metro lines were MRT Line 1, MRT Line 5 and MRT Line 6. Construction of the line is targeted for December 2026. In 2019, the government finalized the construction project of the line. But with the onset of the COVID-19 pandemic, progress on the line's project stalled. On 15 June 2022, the license of MRT Line 1 was handed over to DMTCL by the Road Transport and Highways Division. On 23 October 2022, the government signed an agreement with Nippon Koei Bangladesh Limited to join the company as a consultant for MRT Line 1. In the same year, the government entered into an agreement with Tokyo Construction and Max Infrastructure for the land development work of the only depot of the proposed project at Pitalganj. On 28 December 2022, the day of the inauguration of MRT Line 6, the secretary of the Road Transport and Highways Department said that the construction of the project is possible to start in the first month of 2023 subject to the approval of the prime minister. Its construction was initially scheduled to begin on 26 January 2023, but was moved to 2 February. Finally, the construction of the MRT Line 1 project was inaugurated by Sheikh Hasina in 2 February.

Branch lines

Airport route
Its length is 19.872 km which is going to be built entirely underground. This route will go from Hazrat Shahjalal International Airport to Kamalapur with 12 stations. Commuters can transfer to MRT Line 5 from Notun Bazaar Station via an interchange.

Purbachal route
The 11.361 km route will have 9 stations. It can go from Purbachal New Town to Notun Bazar. Nadda and Notun Bazar stations will be constructed underground while the rest will be elevated. Both Nadda and Notun Bazar stations will have interchanges.

References

Dhaka Metro Rail
Rapid transit lines
Underground rapid transit lines
Rapid transit systems under construction